Michael Joseph Mattimore   (1858–1931) was a 19th-century Major League Baseball player. He played for several teams in the National League and American Association between 1887 and 1890.

External links
Baseball Reference

Major League Baseball pitchers
Major League Baseball outfielders
19th-century baseball players
New York Giants (NL) players
Philadelphia Athletics (AA) players
Kansas City Cowboys players
Brooklyn Gladiators players
Jersey City Skeeters players
Trenton Trentonians players
Oswego Starchboxes players
Utica Pent Ups players
Walla Walla Walla Wallas players
Seattle (minor league baseball) players
1858 births
1931 deaths
People from Clinton County, Pennsylvania
Baseball players from Pennsylvania